KAIT (channel 8) is a television station in Jonesboro, Arkansas, United States, affiliated with ABC, NBC, and The CW Plus. Owned by Gray Television, the station has studios on New Haven Church Road (County Road 766) north of Jonesboro, and its transmitter is located in Egypt, Arkansas.

History
KAIT first signed on July 15, 1963, as an independent station, a venture of Fort Smith businessman George Hernreich. It has been affiliated with ABC since 1965.

Most television markets in the country received at least two VHF commercial channels. However, the Jonesboro market could only receive one VHF license because it was sandwiched between Springfield (channels 3 and 10) to the west, Memphis (channels 3, 5, 10, and 13) to the east, Cape Girardeau (channels 3, 6, 8, and 12) to the north, and Little Rock (channels 2, 4, 7, and 11) to the south. KAIT was fortunate to receive this license, and as a result became the only television station to serve Jonesboro until KTEJ signed on the air in May 1976.

The Hernreich family sold the station to Channel Communications in 1984. That company, in turn, sold KAIT to Cosmos Broadcasting, the broadcasting arm of South Carolina-based insurer Liberty Corporation, in 1986. Liberty exited the insurance business in 2000, bringing the Cosmos stations directly under the Liberty banner. Previous owner Raycom Media obtained the station in 2005 through its purchase of Liberty.

For many years, KAIT also operated a low-power translator station, K11JW, operating on Channel 11 in nearby Blytheville. It is not to be confused with present-day K11JW-D in Russellville, currently serving as a translator for Arkansas PBS member KAFT.

Before the digital transition, the Little Rock-area VHF stations, including KATV (channel 7) and KARK (channel 4), adequately covered parts of the KAIT viewing area. Several cable systems in the KAIT viewing area, including Jonesboro and Blytheville, have carried KATV for decades. In compliance with syndex and must-carry regulations, some systems may black out KATV and KARK when either station airs the same program as KAIT, usually during the daytime and prime time hours, except for breaking news, weather bulletins, and regularly-scheduled newscasts. Other cable systems in parts of the KAIT viewing area that are within in the Little Rock television market that also carry KATV, such as in Searcy and Heber Springs, carry both stations without restrictions.

KAIT has been digital-only since June 12, 2009. The station's digital signal relocated from its pre-transition VHF channel 9 to channel 8 for post-transition operations.

Sale to Gray Television
On June 25, 2018, Atlanta-based Gray Television announced it had reached an agreement with Raycom to merge their respective broadcasting assets (consisting of Raycom's 63 existing owned-and/or-operated television stations, including KAIT, and Gray's 93 television stations) under the former's corporate umbrella. The cash-and-stock merger transaction valued at $3.6 billion – in which Gray shareholders would acquire preferred stock currently held by Raycom – will result in Gray's entry into Arkansas with KAIT. The sale was approved on December 20, and was completed on January 2, 2019.

Transmitter upgrades
On October 4, 2021, KAIT announced it would upgrade its main transmitter to improve its broadcast signal, forcing many antenna viewers to rescan their channels before November 9 so that they would not lose access to the three subchannels, and causing KAIT to broadcast over the K24NY-D transmitter for one week.

Subchannel history

KAIT-DT2
KAIT-DT2 is the NBC-affiliated second digital subchannel of KAIT. Over the air, KAIT-DT2 broadcasts a 720p high definition signal (downconverted from the native 1080i resolution of the NBC network, to preserve bandwidth so that KAIT-DT3 can transmit in 720p HD over-the-air) on channel 8.2; however, a direct-to-cable full 1080i high definition feed of this subchannel is available on select cable providers.

KAIT began carrying NBC programming on its second digital subchannel on January 26, 2015. The subchannel used to broadcast 24/7 weather coverage, and occasionally local sports coverage, starting in 2006. In addition to the NBC network schedule, syndicated programming on KAIT-DT2 includes Jeopardy!, Dr. Phil, Inside Edition, Entertainment Tonight, and Right This Minute, among others.

KAIT-DT3
KAIT-DT3 is the CW-affiliated third digital subchannel of KAIT, broadcasting in 720p high definition on channel 8.3 (hence the on-air branding KAIT CW 8.3). All programming on KAIT-DT3 is received through The CW's programming feed for smaller media markets, The CW Plus, which provides a set schedule of syndicated programming acquired by The CW for broadcast during time periods outside of the network's regular programming hours; however, Gray Television handles local advertising and promotional services for the subchannel. Upon its inception, KAIT-DT3 had been broadcast in the 16:9 widescreen standard definition picture format as, meanwhile, a direct-to-cable 720p high definition feed of this subchannel had been made available on select cable providers; however, ever since an upgrade to KAIT's multiplexer equipment sometime in October 2019, KAIT-DT3 has been broadcasting in HD over-the-air as well.

The subchannel used to broadcast Raycom Media’s The Tube beginning in 2006, until the network’s shutdown on October 1, 2007. The subchannel would not rebroadcast until 11 years later.

On July 25, 2018, KAIT announced it would be bringing The CW programming (via their national CW+ service) into the Jonesboro market through a third subchannel, starting on September 1, 2018; CW programming had previously been seen on cable systems under the false call sign "KJOS" (which stood for K-JOneSboro's WB 21). "KJOS" seamlessly became associated with the new CW network (branded as "Jonesboro's CW 21") on September 18, 2006, after the merger of The WB and UPN into that one network.

On September 11, 2020, KAIT-DT3 started broadcasting Tegna's Daily Blast Live at noon.

Programming

Syndicated programming
In addition to the ABC network schedule, syndicated programming on KAIT includes Wheel of Fortune, The Jennifer Hudson Show, Live with Kelly and Ryan, and Judge Judy, among others.

News operation
KAIT presently broadcasts 24½ hours of locally produced newscasts each week (with 4½ hours each weekday and one hour each on Saturdays and Sundays).

In addition to reporting on local news stories, members of KAIT's reporting staff are also employed as photojournalists for the station. On October 15, 2007, beginning with the 5 p.m. newscast, KAIT's local newscasts were rebranded, replacing the former K8 News branding with Region 8 News, a branding the station had used during much of the 1980s. The station's longtime slogan "Good Neighbors You Can Turn To" (also "Your Good Neighbor Station") was also replaced with a new slogan ("Always Tracking. Always Watching. Always On.")

On September 16, 2011, KAIT announced that upgrade its newscasts to high definition, and broadcast from a new set; the following night, fellow ABC affiliate KATV in Little Rock started broadcasting its local newscasts in HD. On October 17, 2011, beginning with its 11 a.m. newscast, KAIT became the fourth station in Arkansas (the first in Jonesboro) to broadcast its local newscast in high definition.

Although not owned by the same company, KAIT frequently forms a partnership with the Jonesboro Radio Group for community projects and promotions. The three Jonesboro Radio Group stations involved in the partnership are KEGI (100.5 FM), KDXY (104.9 FM) and KJBX (106.3 FM). An audio simulcast of KAIT's 6 p.m. newscast airs weekday evenings on KJBX.

Notable on-air staff
 Ryan Vaughan – chief meteorologist

Notable former on-air staff
 Rodger Bumpass – announcer, film processor, cameraman, audio technician, and technical director (best known for providing the voice of Squidward Tentacles and Dr. Gill Gilliam on Nickelodeon's SpongeBob SquarePants)
 Hogan Gidley – news/weather anchor (now at Newsmax TV)

Subchannels
The station's signal is multiplexed:

Out-of-market coverage
KAIT's home market only comprises Craighead, Clay, Greene, Jackson, Lawrence, Randolph, and Sharp counties in Arkansas. With KAIT's 28,200 watts worth of effective radiated power, KAIT's signal can extend into nearby portions of all neighboring markets (e.g. the Memphis, Little Rock, Springfield, MO, and Cape Girardeau, MO–Paducah, KY markets). Even after the digital transition of 2009, KAIT's over-the-air signal can still be picked up as far south as Forrest City, as far north as Hendrickson, Missouri, as far west as Mountain View and as far east as Tiptonville, Tennessee, and Caruthersville, Missouri. Some of the northern suburbs of Memphis can also pick up at least a grade B signal.

KAIT was dropped from New Wave Communications in Southeast Missouri, in favor of in-market ABC affiliate WSIL and NBC affiliate WPSD on December 31, 2017.

References

External links

AIT
ABC network affiliates
NBC network affiliates
The CW affiliates
Television channels and stations established in 1963
Gray Television
1963 establishments in Arkansas